The High School of Computer Sciences (in Spanish: Escuela Superior de Cómputo or ESCOM) is a High school of the National Polytechnic Institute located in Mexico City, Mexico. Its students pursue the  bachelor's degree in computer engineering with one major: computer systems. The curriculum is designed to last for five years.

The school has a faculty mostly with postgraduate studies, and there is a growing number of teachers with doctoral studies.

History 

The school began classes on 27 September 1993 with 5 classrooms provided by the Superior School of Engineering and Architecture (ESIA) Zacatenco, on the third floor, building 10.  Two of them worked as classrooms, one as a library, one as administrative area, and the other as school management.  Similarly, the Superior School of Engineering and Architecture provided two spaces in the administrative area attached to the building 10, which were used as computer rooms.

From June 30, 2013, to July 4, 2013, the ESCOM participated for first time in the ACM ICPC World Finals.  The team consisted of Christian Hernandez, Ethan Jimenez, and Jair Ramirez.

Undergraduate courses 

 First semester
 Computing and Society
 Programming I (Structured Programming)
 Discrete Mathematics
 Calculus I
 Vector Analysis
 Physics
 Second semester
 Oral and Written Communication
 Programming II (Numerical Analysis)
 Differential Equations
 Calculus II
 Linear Algebra
 Electric Circuits
 Third semester
 Administrative Process
 Programming III (Data Structures)
 Software Engineering I
 Digital Electronics
 Probability and Statistics
 Analog Electronics
 Fourth semester
 Economics
 Operating Systems I
 Databases I
 Introduction to Microprocessors and Microcontrollers
 Software Engineering II
 Digital Communications
 Fifth semester
 Finance
 Operating Systems II
 Object Oriented Programming I
 Databases II
 Computer Networks I
 Data Acquisitions
 Sixth semester
 Project Generation and Evaluation
 Visual Programming
 Object Oriented Programming II
 Artificial Intelligence
 Computer Networks II
 Compilers
 Seventh semester
 Operations Research
 Systems Development Techniques
 Final Work I
 Systems Programming I (Cryptography and Network Security I)
 Advanced Programming I (Mobile Application Development I)
 Developing of Web Applications I
 Eighth semester
 Administration of Computer Centers
 Final Work II
 Systems Programming II (Cryptography and Network Security II)
 Advanced Programming II (Mobile Application Development II)

References

External links 
 Official ESCOM website

Instituto Politécnico Nacional